Elisa New (born 1958) is an American academic who is the Powell M. Cabot Professor of American Literature at Harvard University.

Early life and education
She was born in Philadelphia, Pennsylvania, and raised in Maryland. New's father was an engineer and computer scientist for the National Oceanic and Atmospheric Administration and her mother worked as a party planner. She earned a Bachelor of Arts degree from Brandeis University (1980), as well as a Master of Arts and PhD from Columbia University (1982 and 1988, respectively).

Career 
New's academic specialties include American poetry, American literature, religion in literature, and Jewish literature. Before moving to Harvard, she taught at the University of Pennsylvania. She is also the creator and host of the television show Poetry in America.

Personal life
She had three daughters with her first husband, Fred David Levine, who died in 2013. Before moving to Boston, Massachusetts, the family had resided in Miami, Florida. Levine was a member of the professional staff of the Anti-Defamation League, working in both the National and Florida Regional Offices.

On December 11, 2005, she married economist Lawrence Summers.

Selected works

References

1958 births
Living people
Brandeis University alumni
Harvard University faculty
Columbia University alumni
University of Pennsylvania faculty
Jewish American social scientists
American academics of English literature